U6 or U-6 may refer to:

 German submarine U-6, one of several German submarines
 U6, a railway line on several German underground railway systems:
 U6 U-Bahn line, a line on the Berlin U-Bahn
 U6, a line on the Frankfurt U-Bahn
 U6, a line on the Munich U-Bahn
U6 (Vienna U-Bahn), of the Vienna U-Bahn system.
 The IATA airline designator code for Ural Airlines

 British NVC community U6, Juncus squarrosus – Festuca ovina grassland, one of the calcifugous grassland communities of the British National Vegetation Classification
 Ultima VI, a computer role-playing game
 U6, a U.S. unemployment statistic - see Unemployment#United States Bureau of Labor statistics
 U6 promoter, a gene playing an important role in the synthesis of shRNA
Haplogroup U6
U6 spliceosomal RNA, a small nuclear RNA component of the spliceosome
US military designation for the DHC-2 Beaver aircraft
Miss Madison, an Unlimited Hydroplane boat that carries the American Power Boat Association entrant number U-6.
 Upper sixth (grade 13) in British secondary education

See also
6U (disambiguation)